Pogus Caesar (born 1953) is a British photographer, conceptual artist, archivist, author, curator, television producer and director. He was born in St Kitts, West Indies, and grew up in Birmingham, England.

Early life 
Pogus Caesar was born on the Caribbean island of St Kitts and, at an early age, came to Birmingham in Britain . A self-taught artist, he took up painting seriously in his early 20s. Caesar developed his own technique using a fountain pen, composing, with thousands of tiny dots, detailed drawings that could take months to complete.

Career 
During the early 1980s Caesar was appointed director of the West Midlands Minority Arts Service. He was also the first chairman of Birmingham International Film & Television Festival. For the Arts Council of Great Britain he curated with Lubaina Himid and contributed to exhibitions by Black artists, including Into the Open (1984) and Caribbean Expressions in Britain (1986).

During the late 1980s, Caesar began working in British television – originally as a journalist on Channel 4's Black on Black, then as Series Producer, Director and Series Editor of entertainment, sport and multicultural programmes for Central Television, Carlton Television and BBC. Radio programmes include Mr & Mrs Smith BRMB Radio and The Windrush E. Smith Show, BBC West Midlands. In 1993 Caesar founded a production company, Windrush Productions. In 1995 Caesar was responsible for Carlton Television's multi cultural output - programmes including Respect, Drumbeat and the award-winning multicultural series Xpress.

As a photographer and artist Caesar has worked in Spain, India, South America and Sweden and Denmark, South Africa, Albania and Jamaica, documenting diverse communities. Caesar's artwork and photographs have been acquired by the U.S National Gallery of Art in Washington, D.C., the Victoria & Albert Museum (V&A), National Portrait Gallery, Mappin Art Gallery, Sheffield, Leicester Museum & Art Gallery, Martin Parr Foundation, Bristol, Wolverhampton Art Gallery and Birmingham Museum & Art Gallery represent important visual documents recording key figures in black British history.

Caesar's first publication, Muzik Kinda Sweet, is a photography book featuring black musicians including Lee "Scratch" Perry, Stevie Wonder and Grace Jones. The foreword for the book was written by Paul Gilroy and it was published by OOM Gallery Archive in 2010. Caesar's second book, Sparkbrook Pride (2011), consists of 70 black-and-white photos of residents of Sparkbrook. The book has a foreword written by Benjamin Zephaniah and an introduction by Paris-based photographer Nigel Dickinson. The limited edition photobook Handsworth Riots 1985, documenting the 1985 Handsworth riots in the Handsworth district of Birmingham was published in 2020. 

In 2015 Caesar's photography documenting the Handsworth riots of 1985 was presented by the Victoria & Albert Museum at the Annual Meeting of the World Economic Forum in Switzerland. Caesar was featured in Jacqui MacDonald's book Portraits of Black Achievement: composing successful careers' (Lifetime Careers Ltd, 2001). The book included extended interviews with 70 black achievers, describing what it means to be black in Britain today. 

In 2022, Caesar was named in CasildART's list of the top six Black British photographers, including Charlie Phillips, Armet Francis, Neil Kenlock and James Barnor   

Caesar became a Director of 'Positive View Foundation' in 2022. The charity supports the most deprived 16–25 year olds living on our most challenging estates - their upbringing having led them to negative consequences, both for themselves and others amongst their community. 

Caesar was awarded an honorary doctorate by Birmingham City University in 2018 for his outstanding contribution to the visual arts. Caesar also made the list of "175 Brummies Who Inspire", which includes inspirational people across arts, business, education, sports and science who either hail from Birmingham or have made a significant contribution to the City. 

He was awarded the'Westmore Ezekiel Award' in 2010 by Birmingham Black International Film Festival for his contribution to British television. 

In 1995 Caesar was awarded the 'Prix Circom Regionale' for producing and directing the Central Television series Xpress. 

DACS UK and ARS (Artist Rights Society) New York represent Pogus Caesar's extensive photographic and film archives.

Exhibitions

 Pogus Caesar Paintings – Cartwright Hall, Bradford, 1986. Solo exhibition
 Instamatic Views of New York – National Museum of Film and Photography, Bradford, 1986. Solo exhibition
 Into The Open – Mappin Art Gallery, Sheffield, 1984 (as Curator/Exhibitor). Group exhibition
 Caribbean Expressions in Britain – The Leicester Museum & Art Gallery, 1986 Central Museum and Art Gallery, Northampton, 1986, Cartwright Hall, Bradford, 1987 (as Curator/Exhibitor). Group exhibition
 Break in the Seal – Herbert Art Gallery, Coventry, 1988. Joint exhibition
 Sharp Voices, Still Lives – Birmingham Museum and Art Gallery, 1990. Group exhibition
 Vibes: The Roots of Urban Music – Herbert Art Gallery, Coventry, 2004 / Birmingham Museum & Art Gallery, 2005. Group exhibition
 Burning Images – Revolution Through The Lens – The Drum, Birmingham, 2005. Group exhibition
 Handsworth Riots - Twenty Summers On – OOM Gallery / BBC Mailbox, Birmingham, 2005. Solo exhibition
 From Jamaica Row – Rebirth of the Bullring – OOM Gallery, Birmingham, 2006. Solo exhibition
 Seeing Slavery – Potteries Museum & Art Gallery, Stoke-on-Trent, 2007. Group exhibition
 Religion, Slavery and Diaspora – Horniman Museum & Garden, London, 2007. Group exhibition
 Trespassers Will Be Shot – Survivors Will Be Shot Again – Images of Joburg & Capetown – Friction Arts, Birmingham, 2007. Solo exhibition
 The Art of Ideas – Birmingham, UK, 2008. Group exhibition
 That Beautiful Thing – Wolverhampton Art Gallery, Wolverhampton, 2008. Solo exhibition
 That Beautiful Thing – Three White Walls Gallery, Birmingham, 2008. Solo exhibition
 From Jamaica Row – Rebirth of the Bullring – Kinetic AIU, Birmingham, 2008–09. Solo exhibition
 Muzik Kinda Sweet: Photographs 1985–2009 – Fazeley Studios, Birmingham, 2009. Solo exhibition
 Pattern Recognition – City Gallery, Leicester, 2009. Group exhibition
 Participation: The film and workshop movement 1979–1991 – VIVID Birmingham Exhibition and archive project, 2009
 South Africa – Brighter Flame – Symphony Hall, Birmingham, 2010. Solo exhibition
 Muzik Kinda Sweet – British Music Experience, O2, London, 2011. Solo exhibition
 Reggae Kinda Sweet – Trinity Centre, Bristol, UK. 2012. Solo exhibition
 Reggae Kinda Sweet – The Drum, Birmingham, UK. 2013. Solo exhibition
 Islands on the Edge - Atlantic Wharf Gallery, Boston, USA, 2015. Group exhibition
 Staying Power, V&A Museum, London, 2015. Group exhibition
 Within and Without: Body Image and the Self, Birmingham Museum & Art Gallery, Birmingham, 2019. Group exhibition
 Handsworth "1985" Revisited, Multi Site Billboard Installation with Benjamin Zephaniah, Birmingham, 2019. Joint exhibition
 Inspiring Photographs: Collecting for the Future, National Portrait Gallery, London,UK 2019–2020. Group exhibition
 Birmingham Revolutions: Power to the People, Birmingham Museum and Art Gallery, Birmingham,UK 2019–2020. Group exhibition
 Black Lives Matter, Multi-Site Billboard Installation, London and Birmingham,UK 2020. Solo exhibition
 Dub London: Bassline of a City, Museum of London,UK 2020. Group exhibition.
 Bristol Photo Festival: Island Life, Photographs from the Martin Parr Foundation, Bristol Museum & Art Gallery, Bristol,UK 2021. Group exhibition
 War Inna Babylon: The Community's Struggle for Truths & Rights, Institute of Contemporary Arts, London,UK 2021. Group Exhibition
 Life Between Islands: Caribbean-British Art 1950s – Now, Tate Britain, London,UK 2021/22. Group exhibition
 Creative Connections Herbert Art Gallery & Museum, Coventry, UK 2022. Group Exhibition 
 We Are Birmingham, Birmingham Museum & Art Gallery, Birmingham, UK 2022. Group exhibition
 The Black Triangle Atlas Gallery, London, UK 2022. Group exhibition
 Tower of Dreams Birmingham Museum & Art Gallery, Birmingham, UK 2022. Video installation
 This is Britain: Photographs from the 1970s and 1980s National Gallery of Art,Washington, USA 2023. Group exhibition 
 A Tall Order! - Rochdale Art Gallery in the 1980s Touchstones, Rochdale, UK 2023. Group exhibition

Throughout his career, Caesar has provided support and development for a range of educational and cultural initiatives regionally, nationally and internationally.

Television production credits
  Black On Black, Channel 4, 1985–1986 Multi-cultural current affairs/entertainment series. Line Producer
  Here & Now, Central Television, 1986–1989. Multi-cultural series, featuring Lenny Henry, Maya Angelou, Nigel Benn, Craig Charles, Omar Sharif, Carmen Munroe, James Baldwin. Presenter and Director
  One World, Central Television. 1990–91. Multi-cultural series, featuring Al Sharpton, MC Hammer. Interviewer and Director 
  I'm Black in Britain, Central Television, 1993; 30-minute documentary investigating racism in Britain. Interviewees include John Tyndall of National Front. Interviewer and Director
  Designer Babies, Central Television, 1993. 30-minute documentary on Vitro Fertilization. Interviewees included Patrick Steptoe CBE and Professor Robert Winston. Co-Producer and Interviewer
  The Cook Report, Central Television, 1994. 30-minute current affairs programme. Investigative Reporter
  An Eye on X, Windrush Productions for Carlton Television/ACGB 1995. Short film on micro sculptor Willard Wigan. Producer and Director
  Xpress, Windrush Productions for Carlton Television 1995 14 X 30-minute entertainment series featuring Sharron Davies, Derek Redmond, Mark Morrison, China Black, Rozalla, Ranking Roger of The Beat. Series Producer and Director
  Edwin Starr: Agent 00 Soul, Windrush Productions for Carlton Television 1995. Documentary on American soul singer Edwin Starr. Producer and Director
  Prince at The New Power Generation at the NEC, Windrush Productions for Carlton Television 1995. Short film on Prince and his band including interviews and concert footage. Producer and Director
  Love in Kenya, Windrush Productions for Carlton Television 1995. English woman on holiday finds love and marriage with Kenyan man. Producer and Director
  15 Minute Meals, Windrush Productions for Carlton Television, 1995. Six chefs from around the world cook up local dishes in 15 minutes. Series Producer and Director
  Respect, Carlton Television, 1995 – six 30-minute sports series (documentaries on heavyweight champion boxer Lennox Lewis, British rugby player Martin Offiah, Olympic athlete Judy Simpson, Aston Villa footballer Tony Daley, Olympic athlete John Regis, and disabled tennis player Diana Bowles). Series Producer and Director
  Aaliyah Live in Amsterdam, Windrush Productions, 1995, 51-minute documentary on hip-hop superstar Aaliyah. Producer and Director
  The A-Force, BBC TV Manchester, 1997. 6 x 60-minute entertainment series, lifestyle documentary featuring Jada Pinkett Smith, Dave Chappelle, John Singleton and Isaac Hayes in Toronto, Canada. Senior Producer and Director
  The A-Force, BBC TV Manchester, 1997. 6 x 60-minute entertainment series, lifestyle documentary on AC Milan footballer George Weah in Italy. Senior Producer and Director
  The A-Force, BBC TV Manchester, 1997. 6 x 60-minute entertainment series, lifestyle documentary on Liverpool footballer John Barnes. Senior Producer and Director
  The A-Force, BBC TV Manchester, 1997. 6 x 60-minute entertainment series, Nas & The Fugees in Manchester. Senior Producer
  Drumbeat, Carlton Television, 1999. 6 x 60-minute entertainment/current affairs series. Interviewees including Lynden David Hall, Ruby Turner, Mr Vegas. Series Editor and Presenter

References

External links 
 Sebastian ay, "11 questions with Dr Pogus Caesar", 14 November 2020
 "SHUTTER SPEED: An interview with Dr Pogus Caesar"
 "Photographer in Focus: Pogus Caesar", National Portrait gallery
 Liz Aubrey, "Poggus Caesar2, BuildHollywood, 9-6-2021
 Pogus Caesar at V&A
 "Pogus Caesar: Handsworth Riots 1985, Martin Parr foundation
 "Drinkers and dreamers: Martin Parr's favourite images of postwar Britain and Ireland – in pictures", The Guardian, 29 April 2021
 Rangzeb Hussain, "REVIEW: Handsworth Riots 1985 – Pogus Caesar’s photographs hold a tragic mirror to our age", I Am Birmingham, 27 October 2020
 Emalee Beddoes-Davis, "Artist in Focus: Pogus Caesar", Birmingham Museums, 27 April 2020
 Muzik Kinda Sweet exhibition in Birmingham South Africa – A Brighter Flame exhibition – Symphony Hall Birmingham / OOM Gallery
 "Behind The Lens Of Pogus Caesar", BBC TV
 Creation For Liberation exhibition, UK
 The Pogus Caesar / OOM Gallery Archive at Birmingham City Archives, United Kingdom
 – Pogus Caesar/Black History Month/BBC TV
 .Pogus Caesar interview for Outsideleft Magazine (Los Angeles) 
 "A Different Reality-minority struggles in Britain", Warwick University
 "History in the making", Birmingham Life article. 
 "City artist Pogus Caesar's best work in focus"

Black British artists
Photographers from Birmingham, West Midlands
British television directors
British television producers
Living people
1953 births
21st-century male artists